The Peruvian Civil War of 1867 was the fifth internal conflict in 19th century Peru. It was caused by the adoption of a new constitution to replace the previous one adopted in 1860. Mariano Ignacio Prado, put in power as a result of the Peruvian civil war of 1865, faced by a revolt by his former allies Pedro Diez Canseco and José Balta. On May 30, 1867, former president Ramon Castilla died while attempting to take advantage of the situation.

References
 Basadre Grohmann, Jorge: Historia de la República del Perú (1822 - 1933), Tomo 6. Editada por la Empresa Editora El Comercio S. A. Lima, 2005.  (V.6)
 Chirinos Soto, Enrique: Historia de la República (1821-1930). Tomo I. Lima, AFA Editores Importadores S.A., 1985.
 Vargas Ugarte, Rubén: Historia General del Perú. Noveno Tomo: La República (1844-1879). Segunda Edición.  Editor Carlos Milla Batres. Lima, Perú, 1984. Depósito Legal: B. 22436-84 (IX).

Wars involving Peru
Conflicts in 1867